Georgios Filippidis was a Greek politician and landowner.

Biography 
He was born in Milies, Pelion, was the son of Argyros Filippidis and descended from a wealthy and family of the area. He was president of the community of Milies.

He was elected member of parliament for Larisa, with the support People's Party in the 1932 election and was reelected for Volos in 1933, and for Larisa again in 1935 and 1946.

References 

MPs of Larissa
People from Milies
Greek MPs 1932–1933
Greek MPs 1933–1935
Greek MPs 1935–1936
Greek MPs 1946–1950